Nathan Coley (born 1967 in Glasgow, Scotland, where he currently lives and works) is a contemporary British artist who was shortlisted for the Turner Prize in 2007 and has held both solo and group exhibitions internationally, as well as his work being owned by both private and public collections worldwide. He studied Fine Art at Glasgow School of Art between 1985 and 1989 with the artists Christine Borland, Ross Sinclair and Douglas Gordon amongst others.

The use of found phrases and objects in Coley's work is explained by Tom Hunt, he states that Coley's isolation of these words: "relieves them of specific historical reality and relieves them of a specific historical reality and returns them as representations pitched between aphorism and haiku."

Nathan Coley's most recent show entitled ‘The Future is Inside Us, Not Somewhere Else’ ended in 2019 at Parafin Gallery, Mayfair. The works on display there were also shown at Edinburgh Parliament Hall. Alongside this exhibition, Nathan’s illuminated text ‘THE SAME FOR EVERYONE’ is currently placed on Cunard Place in London, as part of the 9th edition of Sculpture In The City.

Life and work

In 2004, Coley exhibited at The Fruitmarket Gallery in Edinburgh. In Nathan Coley, the artist constructed a series of scaled down, cardboard replicas of all of the religious buildings in Edinburgh. InLamp of Sacrifice, 286 miniature sites of worship are placed in direct confrontation with one another, exploring how religious buildings are characterised by competing social ideologies.

In 2007, Coley was nominated for the Turner Prize for his exhibition at Mount Stuart, Isle of Bute, the public installation Camouflage Church, Santiago de Compostela, Spain and his contribution to the group exhibition 'Breaking Step – Displacement, Compassion and Humour in Recent British Art' at the Museum of Contemporary Art, Belgrade, Serbia.
Investigating the relationship between the rational and the spiritual, Coley's sculpture went on to be exhibited at Tate Liverpool and the Scottish National Gallery of Modern Art, where it became part of the collection in 2010.

In 2010–2011, The Ballast Project was built for the Government Buildings Agency as a commission for the National Maritime Museum (Het Nederlands Scheepvaartmuseum) in Amsterdam.  This installation groups together a collection of bricks which were originally used as ballast for ships departing from the Netherlands for the West India Company during the 17th century.

In 2011, Coley exhibited at the ACCA (Australian Centre for Contemporary Art) in Melbourne. Appearances consisted of vast concrete platforms elevated off of the floor with adjoining steps.  Inspired by Oscar Niemeyer's architectural designs, Coley's Landings]are characterised by a sense of theatricality which renders the viewer, or participant, aware of his or her interaction with the work.

In Memory is an installation which was created in 2011 in Edinburgh at Jupiter Artland. In Memory]consists of an enclosed, artificial graveyard on the edge of an area of Scottish woodland. By chiselling out the names on the salvaged tombstones, Coley draws our attention to the manner in which we invest architectural objects with individual meaning.

Coley's exhibition A Place Beyond Belief showed at Haunch of Venison in 2012 and included a range of photographic and sculptural work relating to the ritualised nature of protest and mourning. Included in the show was an illuminated, scaffolded text, A Place Beyond Belief, which was originally sourced from the testimony of a New Yorker describing a subway journey she made in the days following the 9/11 attacks. An edition of the work was also unveiled outside Kosova Art Gallery in Prishtina, Kosovo on the occasion of their independence from UN supervision .

Coley has had many international solo exhibitions including those at Centro Cultural de Belem, Lisbon in 2001 and Westfalischer Kunstverein, Munster in 2000. His work was also included in Days Like These, a group exhibition at Tate Britain in 2003, and his film Jerusalem Syndrome was on view at the Cooper Gallery in Dundee in 2005.
 
Coley has been awarded with the Artist Award, Scottish Arts Council (2003, 1996), Henry Moore Fellowship (Duncan of Jordanstone College of Art, University of Dundee (2001), Creative Scotland Award, Scottish Arts Council (2001), Scottish Cultural Enterprise, 'Scotland's Year of the Artist,' Public Art Initiative Scheme, Scottish Arts Council (2000) and the RSA, Art for Architecture Award (1997).

Exhibitions 

Selected Solo Exhibitions & Projects 

 2022 Tentative Words Change Everything, Charleston, East Sussex
 2022 Utopias, the Whitworth, Manchester
 2020 From Here, Mann Island, Liverpool, commissioned by Liverpool Biennial and Culture Liverpool
 2019 The Future Is Inside Us, Its Not Anywhere Else, Parafin Gallery, London
 2019 The Future Is Inside Us, Its Not Anywhere Else, Parliament Hall, Edinburgh 
 2017 Palace, The Dick Institute, Kilmarnock
 2017 For Other People and Other Works, Kunstmuseum Magdeburg, Germany
 2017 Nathan Coley, Scottish National Gallery of Modern Art, Edinburgh 
 2017 Nathan Coley, Parafin Gallery, London
 2017 The Same for Everyone, Arhus
 2015 You Create What You Will, New Art Centre, England
 2015 Portraits of Dissension, House Festival, Brighton
 2014 You Imagine What You Desire, Jupiter Artland, Edinburgh
 2014 The Lamp of Sacrifice, 286 Places of Worship, Edinburgh, Gallery of Modern Art, Glasgow
 2014 From the People, to the People, for the People, Future Perfect, Singapore
 2013 A Place Beyond Belief, NDSM-Werf/Neuw Dakota, Amsterdam
 2013 Burn the Village, Feel the Warmth, The Pier Arts Centre, Orkney
 2013 Nathan Coley, Kunstverein Freiburg, Germany   
 2012 Knowledge, Kindness and Courage, Contemporary Art Gallery, Vancouver
 2012 A Place Beyond Belief, Haunch of Venison, London
 2011 Appearances, Australian Centre for Contemporary Art, Melbourne
 2010 in Memory, Jupiter Artland, Edinburgh
 2008 De La Warr Pavilion, Bexhill on Sea, East Sussex, UK                  
 2007 Nathan Coley, Doggerfisher Gallery, Edinburgh
 2006 Nathan Coley, Mount Stuart, Isle of Bute, Scotland
 2005 Jerusalem Syndrome, University of Dundee Cooper Gallery, Dundee, UK
 2004 Nathan Coley, Fruitmarket Gallery, Edinburgh, UK
 2003 Black Tent, Portsmouth Cathedral, Portsmouth, UK (catalogue)
 2002 Ruskin's Road, Leidsche Rijn, Netherlands (as part of 'Super Utrecht')
 2001 Nathan Coley and Bas Jan Ader, Vilma Gold, London, UK
 2000 International Style, Architectural Association, London, UK
 1999 Der Standard, Museum in Progress, Vienna, Austria
 1998 A Public Announcement, The Changing Room, Stirling, UK (catalogue)
 1997 Urban Sanctuary: a public  artwork, Stills Gallery, Edinburgh, UK (catalogue)
 1996 Nathan Coley, Galleri Index, Stockholm, Sweden (catalogue)
 1992 Pure Ideas in a Wicked World, Crawford Arts Centre, St Andrews, UK (catalogue)

Selected Group Exhibitions 

 2012 Crisis Commission, Somerset House
 2011 Communities without Propinquities, Milton Keynes Art Gallery, London
 2009 Mythologies, Haunch of Venison London, UK 
 2008 Tales of Time and Space, Folkestone Triennial, Folkestone, UK
 2007 The Turner Prize, Tate Liverpool, Liverpool, UK
 2006 Northern City (Between Light & Dark), The Lighthouse, Glasgow and Florence, Italy
 2005 British Art Show 6, BALTIC, Gateshead, UK (catalogue)
 2004 The Stars Are So Big, The Earth is So Small….Stay As You Are, Schipper & Krome, Berlin,  
 2003 Independence, South London Gallery, London, UK
 2002 Recent Acquisitions, City Art Centre, Edinburgh, UK
 2001 Audit, Casino Luxembourg, Luxemburg (catalogue)
 2000 Jahresgaben 2000, Westfälischer Kunstverein, Münster
 1999 Blue Suburban Skies, Photographers' Gallery, London, UK
 1998 in Visible Light, Moderna Museet, Stockholm, Sweden (catalogue)
 1996 Girls' High, Old Fruitmarket, Glasgow, UK (catalogue)
 1995 Swarm, Travelling Gallery, Edinburgh, UK (catalogue)
 1994 New Art in Scotland, CCA, Glasgow, UK; Aberdeen Art Gallery, Aberdeen, UK (catalogue)
 1993 Pure Fiction, Intermedia Gallery, Glasgow, UK
 1992 Love at First Sight, The Showroom, London, UK
 1991 Speed, Transmission Gallery, Glasgow, UK
 1990 Fem fra Glasgow, Hordaland Kunstner Centrum, Bergen, Norway

Residencies

 2002 Lockerbie, The Scottish Court in the Netherlands, Holland (unofficial)
 2000 Paisley University, Chemistry Department
 1992 Crawford Arts Centre, St Andrews

Publications

 Nathan Coley, to the Bramley Family of Frestonia, a publication documenting his public art project in London. 2015
 Nathan Coley, Mount Stuart, Isle of Bute, Scotland 2006
 Fiona Bradley, Building the Imagination by Politics of Space: Architecture, Truth and other Fictions in the work Nathan Coley by Susanne Gaensheimer
 Nathan Coley – There Will be no Miracles Here, Fruitmarket Gallery, Edinburgh/Locus +, Newcastle upon Tyne
 Natalie Rudd, Nathan Coley, in Days Like these (Exhibition catalogue), Tate Britain. 2003
 Judith Nesbitt, On being Sane in Insane Places, in Days Like These (Exhibition catalogue), Tate Britain, 2003
 Isabel Carlos, Caci n’est pas un…, in From Work to Text. Dialogues on Practise and Criticism in Contemporary Art, Centro Cultural de Belém, Lisbon
 Natalie Rudd, In the City, in Fabrication (Exhibition catalogue), Cube Gallery Manchester 2002.
 Here + Now (Exhibition catalogue). Dundee Contemporary Arts 2001
 Elisabeth Price, Small Gold Medal, Bookworks, London 2001
 Magda Kardasz, Happy Outsiders (Exhibition catalogue) Zachenta Pañstwowa Galeria Szuki, Warsaw 2002 
 A Maifesto for Bournville, in In the Midst of Things. Edited by Nigel Prince and Gavin Wade, August Media 2000
 A Republican Heaven on Earth. An interview with Boris Kramer, Audit Casino Luxembourg Forum d’art contemporain

See also
[PARAFIN]
Turner Prize
British art

Notes and references

External links
 Nathan Coley's Official Website
 PARAFIN
 Turner Prize Profile

1967 births
Living people
British installation artists
Scottish contemporary artists